Kampung Baru LRT station is an underground rapid transit station, named after and serving Kampung Baru, Kuala Lumpur, in Malaysia. The station is part of the Kelana Jaya Line (formerly known as PUTRA). The station was opened on June 1, 1999, as part of the line's second and latest extension, which includes the addition of 12 stations (not including Sri Rampai station), and an underground line that the Kampung Baru station is connected to. The Kampung Baru station is currently one of only five underground stations in the Kelana Jaya Line.

Location

Located on the southern edge of Kampung Baru, the Kampung Baru station is located directly beside the Ampang–Kuala Lumpur Elevated Highway and Klang River. The adjoining KLCC station, as is the Kuala Lumpur City Centre (KLCC) itself, is situated across the Klang River, 700 metres away. The station is primarily intended to serve the Kampung Baru area.

Layout and design

The Kampung Baru station, like all other underground Kelana Jaya Line stations, is of a simplistic construction consisting of only three levels: the entrance level at street level, and the concourse and platform levels underground. All levels are linked via escalators and stairways, while elevators are additionally provided between the concourse level and the platform level. The station contains only one island platform for two tracks of opposite directions, with floor-to-ceiling platform screen doors sealing the platform from the tracks.

The station has two access points from street level, of which one is larger than the other and is the primary entrance. The secondary access point to the concourse level, just 40 m east from the main entrance, is closed to the public.

See also

 List of rail transit stations in Klang Valley

Kelana Jaya Line
Railway stations opened in 1999
1999 establishments in Malaysia
20th-century architecture in Malaysia